Victoria Corner, New Brunswick is a community in Carleton County, New Brunswick, Canada located on the west side of the Saint John River, 3.71 km north of Wakefield, 10 miles from Woodstock, on the road to Somerville.

History

It was formerly called Bowyers Corner for Charles Bowyer, who was an early settler.

Victoria Corner has been home to the New Brunswick Bible Institute, since 1944.

Notable people

See also
List of communities in New Brunswick

References

External links 
 Public Archives of New Brunswick, Place Names of New Brunswick
 

Communities in Carleton County, New Brunswick